Yancowinna County is one of the 141 Cadastral divisions of New South Wales. 

The county contains the city of Broken Hill (in Picton Parish) and village of Silverton (in Umberumberka Parish). The County also has the hamlets of Wallarunga/The Pinnacles and Burns; and the ghost towns of Tarrawingee and Purnamoota.

Some New South Wales industrial relations laws have excluded the county of Yancowinna. The county is also the only part of New South Wales which is in the same time zone as South Australia (UTC+09:30 rather than UTC+10:00).

The name Yancowinna is believed to be derived from a local Aboriginal word and is also the name of the location within the county of Yancowinna Glen.

Parishes
A full list of parishes found within this county; their current LGA and mapping coordinates to the approximate centre of each location is as follows:

References

Counties of New South Wales